Charles B. Lawrence (December 17, 1820 – April 9, 1883) was an American jurist.

Born in Vergennes, Vermont, Lawrence received his bachelor's degree from Union College in 1841. Lawrence served as an Illinois circuit court judge. From 1864 until 1873, Lawrence served on the Illinois Supreme Court and was chief justice of the court. He lived in Galesburg, Illinois. Lawrence died in Decatur, Alabama.

Notes

1820 births
1883 deaths
People from Galesburg, Illinois
People from Vergennes, Vermont
Union College (New York) alumni
Illinois state court judges
Chief Justices of the Illinois Supreme Court
19th-century American judges
Justices of the Illinois Supreme Court